The Lost Years of Merlin series consists of the following books written by T. A. Barron, describing the experiences of a young Merlin before his appearance in the Arthurian legend.

 Merlin Book 1: The Lost Years of Merlin
 Merlin Book 2: The Seven Songs of Merlin
 Merlin Book 3: The Fires of Merlin
 Merlin Book 4: The Mirror of Merlin
 Merlin Book 5: The Wings of Merlin

Works based on Merlin
Modern Arthurian fiction
Series of children's books